Upp may refer to:

 Unpentpentium, an unsynthesized chemical element with atomic number 155 and symbol Upp
 Upp (band), a British rock/jazz fusion band 
 and their album Upp (album) released in 1975
 Upp, California, an unincorporated community in Mendocino County
 Jerry Upp (1883–1937), an American Major League Baseball player
 Rex Upp, a president of the Association of Environmental & Engineering Geologists
 Ultimate++, an open source IDE and widget toolkit

See also
UPP (disambiguation)